Friday Foster is a 1975 American blaxploitation film written and directed by Arthur Marks and starring Pam Grier in the title role. Yaphet Kotto, Eartha Kitt, Scatman Crothers and Carl Weathers co-starred. It is an adaptation of the 1970-74 syndicated newspaper comic strip of the same name, scripted by Jim Lawrence and illustrated by Jorge Longarón. This was Grier's final film with American International Pictures. The tagline on the film's poster is "Wham! Bam! Here comes Pam!"

Plot
Friday Foster (Grier) is an ex-magazine model turned magazine photographer who refuses to heed her boss's admonitions against becoming involved in the stories to which she is assigned. After witnessing an assassination attempt on the nation's wealthiest African American, Blake Tarr (Thalmus Rasulala), and then seeing her best friend Cloris Boston (Miles) murdered, Friday finds herself targeted for death.  She teams up with private detective Colt Hawkins (Kotto) to investigate, and soon the two are hot on the trail of a plot to eliminate the country's African-American political leadership.

Cast

Analysis

Racial issues 
Uplifting the black family was an important part of black unity and self-determination. The black family, especially black women, was expected to play an important role in shaping the next generation. Although the viewer never see who Friday's parents are, her younger brother, Cleave, whom she cares for, is a presence in the film. Cleave represents the next generation in this film. Friday's mission to find and have the hitmen arrested is also a mission to protect her younger brother. As we are to assume that Friday is his only family, if she were to die, her brother would become an orphan and might fall victim to the common traps of black life: poverty, drugs, gangs, etc. Grier herself talks about the disintegration of black family in an interview with Ebony.

People are not going to church anymore. There's more corruption, more kids dropping out, more young girls from the ages for 13 to 16 who are becoming pregnant. Families have disintegrated. Our parents aren't as strict today. They're not showing that hard, firm love like they used to. I feel we have just lost respect for one another as human beings.

Protecting the next generation from the criminal life would give them the opportunity to be better educated than the last and be leaders in the community and promote black unity. Education was an important part of black power. It was believed that "treating black children as creative, educable beings (rather than aberrant or dysfunctional ones), these revamped institutions would emphasize racial and cultural difference in a positive way--by nurturing a youngster's sense of self and instilling respect for collective responsibility and action."

Beyond broader education, the movie also promotes the idea of educating the young in commerce. The first time the movie shows Cleve, he is counting money in a closet filled with presents. Further into the movie, it is shown that he is getting this money by selling the gifts that Fancy brings for Friday. When asked whether or not he is hustling now, he responds, "Nope, strictly black capitalism."

The film also introduces viewers to comedic versions of two common characters within the black community—the black cop and the pimp. As expressed by Stokely Carmichael, "... black Americans have two problems: they are poor and they are black. All other problems arise form this two-sided reality: lack of education, the so-called apathy of black men." These characters are a part of a disillusioned older generation caught in the claws of systemic oppression, poverty and being black.

In the midst of solving the murder of two of her friends as well as the attempted murder of Black billionaire, Blake Tarr, Friday uncovers a political movement that plans to unify all of the black politicians. As the movie shows, this would be the first time the black politicians all worked together to tear down "walls of prejudice and discrimination." The unity of black politicians would mean a stronger black presence in government and black power. In the words of Stokely Carmichael, "Politically, black power means what it has always meant to SNCC: the coming-together of black people to elect representatives and to force those representatives to speak to their needs."

However, the omnipresent threat of white supremacy is always a problem. In the movie, this threat is working to destroy black power by killing all of the black leaders that are a part of the movement for black political unity. Ironically, the person coordinating the attack for the white man is a black man, Charles Folley. This confuses Friday, who doesn't understand how someone black could work against their own community. But, as the senator points out, "Some n****** will do anything for a dollar."

Gender issues
Grier said, "I took the parts no other Hollywood starlet would touch because they didn't want to be demeaned or mess up their nails. It was a risk but I didn't know any better and somehow I came out on top" in response to a question about the heavy sexual visuals in her films. She also made the point of saying that she took those roles, because they were the only ones available to black actresses at the time. However, as she gained more autonomy she was able to control how her character was portrayed in films.

In her interview with Ebony magazine, Grier says, "Half the black men do not respect women. They do not respect their little sisters; they're still using profanity in front of them." This behavior is prevalent in Friday Foster. She also told Jet magazine, "I want to show them I'm not just another body for the camera but a serious actress."

In the film, Friday also reflects on the intersectionality of her identities as a black woman. When Blake Tarr asks about her she says, "First, I'm a woman."

See also
 List of American films of 1975

References

External links
 
 
 
 
 

1975 films
1970s action thriller films
African-American drama films
American action thriller films
American International Pictures films
American neo-noir films
Blaxploitation films
1970s English-language films
Films about photojournalists
Films about race and ethnicity
Films based on American comics
Films based on comic strips
Films directed by Arthur Marks
Films set in Los Angeles
Live-action films based on comics
1970s American films